CityLine is a Canadian talk show and lifestyle television program hosted by Tracy Moore produced for the Citytv network at Toronto flagship station CITY-DT. Each show has a theme that changes daily. These include "Around the House", "Family Day", "Home Day", and "Fashion Friday". It is Canada's longest running daytime show specifically targeted to women. The show also airs in the United States on the Dabl digital multicast network and is syndicated on local television stations.

Originally hosted by Dini Petty, the show was hosted by Marilyn Denis between September 1989 and May 23, 2008. Subsequent to Denis's departure to host The Marilyn Denis Show for CTV, a series of guest hosts were used, including Jessica Holmes, Jennifer Valentyne, Jody Vance, Liz West, Dina Pugliese, Christine Cardoso, Tracy Moore, Catherine Marion and Nalini Sharma. Moore was named the new permanent host in 2008.

Prior to fall 2008, Cityline was aired live. However, Cityline is now taped in advance and then aired exactly a week from the date it was recorded. CityLine airs on all Citytv stations across Canada, and formerly also aired on the A-Channel network as well as BCTV and ATV, which was co-owned with Citytv until it was sold. It is currently managed by Rogers Communications Inc. under their Rogers Media brand.

Personalities
Host: Tracy Moore

Cityline revolves around regular lifestyle experts from chefs, to design, to decor, including:
 Massimo Capra
 Randy Feltis
 Frank Ferragine
 Mairlyn Smith
 Brian Gluckstein
 Leigh Ann Allaire Perrault
 Shoana Jensen
 Janice Meredith
 Devan Rajkumar
 Bill Rowley
 Karen Sealy

Toronto's Next Top Model
Toronto's Next Top Model was broadcast as a segment on Cityline's Fashion Fridays in May 2005. Ten aspiring models were selected from over 1,000 applicants and judged on live television. To promote the connection to America's Next Top Model, Cityline invited ANTM stylist Jay Manuel as a guest on the final episode.

The winner was decided by three high-profile fashion industry professionals, and influenced by an online vote open to the Canadian public. The judges were Elmer Olsen, head of Elmer Olsen Models, Ceri Marsh, editor of Fashion magazine, and Lisa Rogers, one of Canada's first top international models and now a consultant on Cityline.

The winner, Lisa Caroline Leung, of Toronto, walked away with a modeling contract from Elmer Olsen Models, the chance to model on Cityline, a fashion shoot with fashion photographer Gabor Jurina and a spread in the 2005 summer issue of Fashion magazine. Leung was the first multiracial person to ever win any of the Top Model competitions or competition spin-offs.

References

External links
 

1984 Canadian television series debuts
Citytv original programming
Television shows filmed in Toronto
1980s Canadian television talk shows
1990s Canadian television talk shows
2000s Canadian television talk shows
2010s Canadian television talk shows
2020s Canadian television talk shows